Spring on the Oder is a 1967 Soviet action film directed by Ivan Lukinsky.

Plot 
The film takes place during the Second World War. The Germans are preparing sabotage groups from Russians to send them to the Soviet Union. One of them decides to interfere with their plans...

Cast 
 Gennadiy Bortnikov as Nikolay Berezhnikov
 Nikolai Skorobogatov as Lifanov (as N. Skorobogatov)
 Imedo Kakhiani as Archil Tatishvili (as I. Kakhiani)
 Aleksandr Novikov as Mandrykin (as A. Novikov)
 Sergey Yakovlev as Ivan Besavkin (as S. Yakovlev)
 Olev Eskola as Anberg (as O. Eskola)
 Heino Mandri as Emar (as H. Mandri)
 Yevgeni Burenkov as Voronin

References

External links 
 

1967 films
1960s Russian-language films
Soviet action films
1960s action films